Vesicle-associated membrane protein 2 (VAMP2) is a protein that in humans is encoded by the VAMP2 gene.

Function 

Synaptobrevins/VAMPs, syntaxins, and the 25-kD synaptosomal-associated protein SNAP25 are the main components of a protein complex involved in the docking and/or fusion of synaptic vesicles with the presynaptic membrane. VAMP2 is a member of the vesicle-associated membrane protein (VAMP)/synaptobrevin family. VAMP2 is thought to participate in neurotransmitter release at a step between docking and fusion. Mice lacking functional synaptobrevin2/VAMP2 gene cannot survive after birth, and have a dramatically reduced synaptic transmission, around 10% of control. The protein forms a stable complex with syntaxin, synaptosomal-associated protein, 25 kD, and complexin. It also forms a distinct complex with synaptophysin.

Clinical significance 

Heterozygous mutations in VAMP2 cause a neurodevelopmental disorder with hypotonia and autistic features (with or without hyperkinetic movements).

Interactions 

VAMP2 has been shown to interact with:

 RABAC1,
 SNAP-25, 
 SNAP23, 
 STX1A,  and
 STX4.

References

Further reading